Michael Stevens is an American musician and composer. He has collaborated with Kyle Eastwood on numerous projects, including the film scores to Clint Eastwood's films, 
Mystic River in 2003, Million Dollar Baby in 2004, Letters from Iwo Jima in 2006, Gran Torino in 2008 and Invictus in 2009. He was nominated with Kyle Eastwood for a 2006 Chicago Film Critics Association Award for Original Score (Letters from Iwo Jima).

References

American film score composers
American male film score composers
Living people
Year of birth missing (living people)
American male jazz musicians